Flor de Toloache is an all-female mariachi band based in New York City and founded by Mireya I. Ramos and Shae Fiol in 2008.

Flor de Toloache first began playing in the New York City subways where they were noticed by numerous media outlets including the New York Times. In 2014, they released their first album Mariachi Flor de Toloache and in 2016 they toured with The Arcs after having contribute to their album Yours, Dreamily. In 2017, they won a Latin Grammy for "Best Ranchero/Mariachi Album" for their second studio album Las Caras Lindas. In 2019, they were nominated for a Grammy for "Best Latin Rock, Urban or Alternative Album" for their third studio album Indestructible,  which was produced by Rafa Sardina and includes collaborations with notable artists including John Legend, Miguel, Camilo Lara, and Alex Cuba.

Members 
As of 2022

 Mireya Ramos – vocals, violin, guitarrón (bandleader)
 Shae Fiol – vocals, vihuela (bandleader)
 Julia Acosta – trumpet, vocals (former bandleader)
 Anna Garcia – trumpet 
 Elena Lacayo – guitarrón, vocals 

Former members include:
 Domenica Fossati – flute
 Luisa Bastidas – violin
 Jackie Coleman – trumpet
 Sita Borahm Chay – violin
 Lisa Maree Dowling – bass, guitarrón
 Jacquelene Acevedo – percussion
 Rachel Therrien – trumpet
 Yesenia Reyes – guitarrón
 Blanca Gonzales - violin

References 

Mariachi groups
Musical groups from New York City
Musical groups established in 2008
2008 establishments in New York City
Latin Grammy Award for Best Ranchero/Mariachi Album
All-female bands
Women in Latin music